Eric Heath may refer to:

 Eric Heath (architect) (1894–1952), Australian architect
 Eric Heath (artist) (born 1923), New Zealand artist